Clarabella may refer to:
"Clarabella" (song), a pop song composed by Frank Pingatore and recorded by The Jodimars
Clarabella (organ stop), an 8′ organ stop with a clear flute-quality tone
The Dutch and Italian names of the Clarabelle Cow fictional character from the Mickey Mouse universe